Susanne Ussing (November 29, 1940 – March 8, 1998) was a Danish artist, architect and ceramicist. The feminine world fascinated her. A large portion of her works were created with organic materials. With her husband, Carsten Hoff, the created a design studio called Ussing and Hoff. in 1970, after her design studio was created, she began to practice her expertise in housing construction. Ussing entered the Danish Architects' Association competition from 1970 - 1973 using award-winning ideas for multi-story homes. The fusing of art and living life was a continuous them in Ussing's work. The Women's Exhibition in 1975 and the Children's Exhibitions, shown across her country, from 1978-1979 showed this theme.
Ussing and Hoff's workshop caught fire in 1984. Ussing did not allow this to stop her as she still presented her burnt pieces at the North Jutland Art Museum, in 1987. In 1988 she won the Nykredit Architecture Prize and in 1989 she received the Eckersberg Medal. The years until her passing consisted of Ussing participating in decorating tasks and presenting her ceramic works in a number of exhibitions.

Education 
The Academy's School of Architecture (Denmark, 1960-1963)
Work in a Drawing studio for four months and a Sculpting studio for eight months (Florence, Italy 1963-1964)

Artworks 
 "In the Greenhouse" (Denmark, 1980).
 "Seaweed Church" (Louisiana Museum of Modern Art, Denmark, 1980–84).

Exhibitions 
 Women's exhibition (Charlottenborg, Copenhagen, 1975).
 Children's Exhibition (Louisiana Museum of Modern Art, Denmark, 1978).
 Retrospective exhibition "Susanne Ussing – works 1957-87" (Nordjyllands Kunstmuseum, Denmark, 1987).
 Retrospective exhibition "Susanne Ussing" (Den Fri Udstillingsbygning, Denmark 2014).
 Children Exhibition Susanne Ussing's Children Exhibition(Denmark, 1978)

References

External links
 Kvindebiografisk Leksikon in Danish

1940 births
1998 deaths
Danish artists
Women architects
Recipients of the Eckersberg Medal
20th-century Danish architects
20th-century Danish women artists
20th-century Danish artists
Danish women architects